Harry McGee is the current political correspondent with The Irish Times. He has previously worked for several publications, including being political editor of the Irish Examiner, as well as jobs with the Sunday Tribune, the Sunday Press, the Connacht Tribune newspapers, public service broadcaster Raidió Teilifís Éireann and has also edited Magill. He has appeared as a commentator on RTÉ Radio 1, Newstalk and TV3.

McGee is originally from Salthill, County Galway. His mother, Eithne Conway-McGee, was a doctor, and was President of the Irish College of General Practitioners for a time. He studied at University College Galway, earning a BA (1987), HDip (1989) and LLB (1993). He has won the award for Young Journalist of the Year. He left his job as the Political Editor with the Irish Examiner to take up a new job with The Irish Times in January 2008 and was promoted to the post of Political Correspondent for that publication in December 2009.

McGee additionally holds the position of Publicity Officer with the Irish Mountaineering Club.

References

External links
 (archived via Wayback Machine)
Politics blog at The Irish Times

Year of birth missing (living people)
Living people
Alumni of the University of Galway
Connacht Tribune people
Irish Examiner people
Irish magazine editors
Magill people
People from County Galway
Sunday Tribune people
The Irish Times people